Zhang Lan (born 18 September 1968) is a Chinese ice hockey player. She competed in the women's tournament at the 1998 Winter Olympics.

References

1968 births
Living people
Chinese women's ice hockey players
Ice hockey players at the 1998 Winter Olympics
Olympic ice hockey players of China
Place of birth missing (living people)